Hoseynabad-e Malek (also Romanized as Ḩoseynābād-e Malek) is a village in Qoroq Rural District, Baharan District, Gorgan County, Golestan Province, Iran. At the 2006 census, its population was 1,171, in 296 families.

References 

Populated places in Gorgan County